Dodnash Priory was a small Augustinian priory located in Bentley, Suffolk, England, near the village's boundary with East Bergholt. It was situated close to Dodnash brook, which flows into the River Stour.

History

Foundation
Although details of the priory's foundation are scant, its charters show that it was established in about 1188 by Wimer the Chaplain, sheriff of Norfolk and Suffolk and a prominent servant of Henry II, on land granted by the Tosny family.

Priory life
The religious life of Dodnash Priory and the secular life of the surrounding area are recorded in its charters, which are thought to contain the first known references to Flatford Mill. The priory initially held lands in Bentley, East Bergholt and Chelmondiston and in 1327 its prior was granted free warren over lands in Bentley, East Bergholt and Falkenham. Other property and rents were later acquired in mortmain, and by 1485 the priory's endowment included rents and lands in 15 Suffolk parish, as well as the tithe of barley in Falkenham. 

The priory was home to a small number of canons (four are recorded as living there in 1381) of the Order of Saint Augustine.

Dissolution
Dodnash Priory was dissolved in 1525 by Cardinal Wolsey and its endowment used to found colleges in Ipswich and Oxford. At the time, it was home to just three canons and was considered to small to be viable. It was surrendered on 1 February 1525 by its last prior, Thomas, in the presence of Thomas Cromwell and other members of Wolsey's commission. 

The priory and its lands were later assigned to the Tollemache family.

The priory today
Archaeological evidence of the priory has all but disappeared, save for a pile of re-used mediaeval stone in a field that can be accessed via a public footpath. The name also survives in the name of Dodnash Priory Farm.

List of priors
Priors of Dodnash included:

 John de Goddesford, resigned 1346
 Adam Newman, elected 1346
 Thomas de Thornham, resigned 1383
 John Capel, elected 1406
 Robert Newbone, resigned 1438
 Michel de Colchester, elected 1438
 Richard Whytyng, elected 1444
 Thomas, resigned 1525

References

History of Suffolk
Monasteries in Suffolk
Christian monasteries established in the 12th century
Augustinian Order
1520s disestablishments in England
Ruined abbeys and monasteries
Ruins in Suffolk
Babergh District
East Bergholt